The 2017 Monterrey Challenger was a professional tennis tournament played on hard courts. It was the eighth edition of the tournament which was part of the 2017 ATP Challenger Tour. It took place in Monterrey, Mexico from 2 to 8 October 2017.

Singles main-draw entrants

Seeds

 1 Rankings are as of 25 September 2017.

Other entrants
The following players received wildcards into the singles main draw:
  Lucas Gómez
  Tigre Hank
  Luis Patiño
  Manuel Sánchez

The following players received entry into the singles main draw using protected rankings:
  Kevin King
  Bradley Klahn

The following players received entry from the qualifying draw:
  Emilio Gómez
  Jared Hiltzik
  Kaichi Uchida
  Aleksandar Vukic

Champions

Singles

  Maximilian Marterer def.  Bradley Klahn 7–6(7–3), 7–6(8–6).

Doubles

  Christopher Eubanks /  Evan King def.  Marcelo Arévalo /  Miguel Ángel Reyes-Varela 7–6(7–4), 6–3.

External links
Official Website

2017 in Mexican tennis
2017 ATP Challenger Tour
October 2017 sports events in Mexico